The Masurian Institute (Polish: Instytut Mazurski) in Olsztyn is a scientific research institution established in 1943 during World War II in the Nazi occupied Poland in Radość near Warsaw by the underground Masurian Union (Związek Mazurski), since 1945 the headquarters moved to Olsztyn, the main city of the Masurian movement.

Since 1948 the Masurian Institute is a scientific branch of the Western Institute in Poznań, and since 1953 part of the Polish Historical Society (Polskie Towarzystwo Historyczne).

Area of activities
 all kind of research related to the region of Warmia-Masuria in north-eastern Poland (see also: Warmia, Masuria).

Main publication
 Komunukaty Warmińsko-Mazurskie (Warmian-Masurian Messages)

Learned societies of Poland
Polish regional societies
Olsztyn